Neoparasitylenchus is a genus of nematodes belonging to the family Allantonematidae.

Species:

Neoparasitylenchus betulae 
Neoparasitylenchus chalcographi 
Neoparasitylenchus cinerei 
Neoparasitylenchus cryphali 
Neoparasitylenchus hylastis 
Neoparasitylenchus ligniperdae 
Neoparasitylenchus notati 
Neoparasitylenchus orthotomici 
Neoparasitylenchus pessoni 
Neoparasitylenchus pityophthori 
Neoparasitylenchus poligraphi 
Neoparasitylenchus scolyti 
Neoparasitylenchus wuelkeri

References

Nematodes